The McEwen ministry (Country–Liberal Coalition) was the 43rd ministry of the Government of Australia. It was led by the country's 18th Prime Minister, John McEwen. The McEwen ministry succeeded the Second Holt ministry, which dissolved on 19 December 1967 following the disappearance of former Prime Minister Harold Holt – the third and most recent occasion where a sitting Prime Minister died in office. Since McEwen was the head of the Country Party, it was a caretaker ministry until the senior partner in the Coalition, the Liberal Party, could elect a new leader. John Gorton was ultimately elected on 9 January 1968, and he was sworn in as Prime Minister along with his ministry the following day.

As of 26 January 2023, Ian Sinclair and Peter Nixon are the last surviving members of the McEwen ministry. James Forbes, who died in 2019, was the last surviving Liberal minister, and Allen Fairhall, who died in 2006, was the last surviving Liberal Cabinet minister.

Cabinet

Outer ministry

See also
 Page Ministry
 Forde Ministry

Notes

Ministries of Elizabeth II
Australian Commonwealth ministries
1967 establishments in Australia
1968 disestablishments in Australia
Cabinets established in 1967
Cabinets disestablished in 1968